, also known as Universe Nekoko, is a Japanese dream pop duo from Kanagawa formed in 2012. It was formed by Nemuko Yamanaka and Kо̄hei Tanabe, but currently comprises Yamanaka and Kano. The duo have never released their faces, instead choosing to identify themselves through anime avatars.

Background
Uchuu Nekoko was formed in 2012 by Nemuko Yamanaka (vocals, guitar) and Kо̄hei Tanabe (bass). Their cover artwork is made by Tomoko Ōshima. In 2014, they collaborated with Lovely Summer Chan, releasing in December Uchuu Nekoko and Lovely Summer Chan. On 17 August 2016, they released their debut album Hibi no Awa. Earlier in the year, on 20 July, they released a compilation of four remixes of their song Online Love (along with the song itself) in the form of Online Love -Remixes-. Between these releases, on August 3, Uchuu Nekoko released an EP titled Summer Sunny Blue EP (comprising four songs from Hibi no Awa). On 2 August 2017, Kano announced they were joining the band as a vocalist. After Kano joined, Tanabe left the group.

In 24 May 2019, Uchuu Nekoko released Kimi No Youni Ikiretara. It was named as an "essential release" by the Bandcamp Daily Staff, who connected the sound to My Bloody Valentine.

On 28 September 2021, the band released Hino Ataru Basyo Ni Kiteyo.

Discography
Albums
 Hibi no Awa (2016, P-Vine Records, LOOM Records)
 Kimi no Youni Ikiretara (2019, LOOM Records)
 Hino Ataru Basyo Ni Kiteyo (2021, LOOM Records)

Singles and EPs
 Uchuu Nekoko and Lovely Summer Chan (2014)
 Online Love -Remixes- (2016)
 Summer Sunny Blue EP (2016)

References

External links
 Uchuu Nekoko (@universe_nekoko) on Twitter

Japanese alternative rock groups
Shoegazing musical groups
Musical groups from Kanagawa Prefecture
Dream pop musical groups